Staind: The Videos is a DVD by the rock band Staind. It was released by Atlantic Records on November 14, 2006. A companion singles collection, called The Singles: 1996–2006, was released on the same date. Notable is the absence of the video to the studio version of "Outside".

Track listing
"Just Go"
"Mudshovel"
"Home"
"Outside" (Family Values live version, featuring Fred Durst)
"It's Been Awhile"
"Fade"
"For You"
"Epiphany"
"Price to Play"
"How About You"
"So Far Away"
"Right Here"
"Falling"
"Everything Changes"

Bonus tracks
"Sober" (Tool cover) (live acoustic)
"Everything Changes" (live acoustic)

References

Staind video albums
2006 compilation albums
2006 video albums
Music video compilation albums
Staind compilation albums